Walter Balmer Hislop (26 November 1886 – 28 April 1915) was a portrait painter and landscape artist.

Hislop trained at the Edinburgh College of Art. His parents were Margaret Robertson Hislop and John Hislop (ex-bailie of Leith), and they lived in a house named 'Summerside' on Pentland Avenue in Colinton, Edinburgh. He attended Leith Academy and in 1901 was awarded a Dux medal. He graduated with a Diploma in Drawing and Painting in 1909 and served on the staff from 1911-12.

During World War I Hislop served with ‘D’ Company, 1/5th (Queen's Edinburgh Rifles) Battalion, Royal Scots, having been commissioned into the regiment as a Second lieutenant in March 1914. He was involved in the Gallipoli Campaign but died on 28 April 1915 (aged 28) and is buried in Redoubt Cemetery Helles, Gallipoli, Turkey. His name appears on the War Memorial in the grounds of Colinton Parish Church. His sister was Jessie Hislop who married the Edinburgh artist Adam Bruce Thomson in 1918.

Hislop mainly painted portraits and landscapes particularly around Edinburgh and East Lothian. His work rarely appears on display although two oil works on canvas were sold recently.

References

Further reading 
 Scott Lawrie - The History of Edinburgh College of Art 1906-1969, MPhil Thesis, 1995. Copies held in ECA library and Heriot-Watt University Library.

1886 births
1915 deaths
20th-century Scottish painters
Scottish male painters
Alumni of the Edinburgh College of Art
Artists from Edinburgh
British military personnel killed in World War I
British Army personnel of World War I
Landscape artists
Scottish landscape painters
Scottish watercolourists
Royal Scots officers
Burials at Redoubt Commonwealth War Graves Commission Cemetery
20th-century Scottish male artists